Zierscheibe (German for "ornamental disk") in archaeology is the term for a kind of metal jewellery dating to the European Iron Age. They are found in graves and are thought to have been worn as pendants attached to the tunica, or as part of a belt pouch.

Early examples date to the Late Bronze Age (ca. 800 BC). They develop into characteristic designs notably attested from Alamannic graves from the migration period.

See also
Black Sun (symbol) - Nazi symbol potentially based on a Zierscheibe  design
Bracteate
Brooch
Fibula (brooch)

References

Archaeological artefact types
Types of jewellery
Archaeology of Alemannia
Germanic archaeological artifacts